Tun Razak Highway, Federal Route 12 (Lebuhraya Tun Razak), also known as Segamat-Kuantan Highway (Lebuhraya Segamat-Kuantan), Asian Highway Route 142, is a  federal highway running from the town of Segamat, Johor to Gambang before proceeding another  via Federal Route 2 to Gambang near Kuantan, Pahang. This two-lane federal road is named in honor of Tun Abdul Razak, Malaysia's second Prime Minister which was known as Malaysia's Father of Development. The highway is part of the Asian Highway Network of route 142.

Route background
The Kilometre Zero of the Federal Route 12 is located at Segamat, Johor, at its intersection with the Federal Route 1, the main trunk road of the central of Peninsular Malaysia. Next, the highway passes the Johor-Pahang border near Perwira Jaya at Pahang side.

The Federal Route 12 intersects the Bera Highway (Federal Route 11) at Bandar Tun Abdul Razak. Next, the highway overpasses the Federal Route 63 at Bandar Muadzam Shah Interchange. After that, the highway crosses the Pahang River at Paluh Hinai. Finally, the highway ends at Gambang, Pahang, at its 4-way intersection with the Federal Route 2, the main trunk road of the east and west coasts of Peninsula Malaysia.

History
The Tun Razak Highway is the brainchild of Sultan of Pahang, Sultan Haji Ahmad Shah. The construction of the highway began in 1970 and was completed in 1983. Sultan Haji Ahmad Shah himself inaugurated the Tun Razak Highway in 1983 when he was the Yang di-Pertuan Agong at that time. The Tun Razak Highway was gazetted as the Federal Route 12 on 19 October 1989.

Built under Malaysia's New Economic Policy, this 2-lane federal highway is built with reasons as follows:-
 To shorten the traveling distance time from southwestern towns and cities such as Segamat, Tangkak, Muar, Batu Pahat and Melaka to eastern states of Peninsular Malaysia.
 To speed up the development of the poorly developed areas in southern Pahang.

Even though the highway is generally straight with less sharp corners, the Tun Razak Highway is notorious for its many accidents due to the steady increase of traffic. On 20 June 2010, Malaysian Ministry of Works, Datuk Shaziman Abu Mansor, proposed the Tun Razak Highway to be upgraded to a four-lane highway as a preventive measure to reduce accidents. Instead, the highway was upgraded to JKR R5 standard with wider medians, roadside and single-carriageway lanes. The upgrade project began in September 2015, with the first phase involving the 47-km segment from Gambang to Paloh Hinai, with the cost of RM300 million. The second phase, which would involve the upgrade works of the remaining 100 km from Paloh Hinai to Segamat, would cost RM1.2 billion.

Features

Notable features
 Paluh Hinai Bridge crosses Pahang River at Paluh Hinai, Pahang.
 One diamond interchange at Bandar Muadzam Shah, Pahang.
 There are numerous of rest and service areas (R&R) along the highway such as those at Paluh Hinai, Bandar Muadzam Shah and RISDA Keratong.

At most sections, the Federal Route 12 was built under the JKR R5 road standard, allowing maximum speed limit of up to 90 km/h.

Federal Route 106 Jalan Belimbing-Pahang Tua (1.1 km) overlaps with Tun Razak Highway. There are no alternate routes or sections with motorcycle lanes.

List of interchanges, intersections and towns

References

012
Highways in Malaysia